The Person Dignity Theory was a Vietnamese political doctrine and ideology coined by Ngô Đình Nhu in 1954, based on Emmanuel Mounier's works. It was also the official ideology of the Cần Lao Party, a former political party.

Doctrine
The Cần Lao Party's leader Ngô Đình Nhu created this ideology to oppose the ideology of the Vietnamese Communist Party. The Person Dignity Theory proposed a "third way" between capitalism and communism, both of which it accused of being strictly materialist. Both capitalism and communism assume that people are only instruments of production, while the Person Dignity Theory promoted a spiritual and physical person, with consequential changes for supply and demand based not on the individual but on the community.

The Personal Dignity Theory is based on "Three Theories":
Personalism
Community (the community's good)
Spiritual (as opposed to materialism)

The Person Dignity Theory emphasized the well-being of the community. The ideal community, as the theory postulated, was based on family, society, nation, humanity and nature. The spiritual was believed to strengthen the community and move further towards "truth, compassion, unity". To realize the Person Dignity Theory, a political party was needed to promote the ideology, as well as achieving social justice and technological modernization which the theory saw as important.

International link
The Person Dignity Theory drew inspiration from many world leaders, such as Juan Perón of Argentina, Carlos Castillo Armas of Guatemala, Sukarno of Indonesia, António de Oliveira Salazar of Portugal, Francisco Franco of Spain and Norodom Sihanouk of Cambodia.

See also 

 Humanism
The Quiet American

References

Further reading

 Emmanuel Mounier, Révolution personnaliste et communautaire, F. Aubier, 1932–1935.
 Emmanuel Mounier, De la Propriété Capitaliste à la Propriété Humaine,  Desclée de Brouwer, 1936.
 Emmanuel Mounier, Le personnalisme., Presses universitaires de France, 1950.

Political theories
Political ideologies
Politics of Vietnam
Christian democracy
1954 introductions